The 2014 European Judo Championships were held in Montpellier, France from 24 to 27 April 2014.

Medal overview

Men

Women

Medal table

Results overview

Men

–60 kg

–66 kg

–73 kg

–81 kg

–90 kg

–100 kg

+100 kg

Teams

Women

–48 kg

–52 kg

–57 kg

–63 kg

–70 kg

–78 kg

+78 kg

Teams

References

External links
 
 
 2014 EJC website
 2014 Team EJC website
 Results
 Team results

 
European Judo Championships
Judo
Judo
Judo
Europe
Europe
Judo European Championships